Shaun Charles Close (born 8 September 1966) is an English former association football centre forward. He started his career as a youth player for Tottenham Hotspur, then had a spell with Halmstad in Sweden and after that, spent a season at Bournemouth. In 1989, he was signed by Swindon Town manager Osvaldo Ardiles,  In 1993, he spent a season with Barnet, before moving down to non-league with Bishop's Stortford. In his later years took up Lawn Bowls and became quite proficient.

References / external links
Swindon-Town-FC.co.uk - Shaun Close
Barnet Fan Club of Norway

Living people
1966 births
English footballers
Association football forwards
Allsvenskan players
Tottenham Hotspur F.C. players
Halmstads BK players
AFC Bournemouth players
Swindon Town F.C. players
Barnet F.C. players
Bishop's Stortford F.C. players
English expatriate footballers
Expatriate footballers in Sweden